Anna Karenina (stylized as Annakarenina) is a Philippine television drama series broadcast by GMA Network. Directed by Gil Tejada Jr., it stars Antoinette Taus, Sunshine Dizon and Kim delos Santos in the title role. It premiered on November 10, 1996 on the network's Sunday afternoon line up replacing Lovingly Yours, Helen. The series concluded on April 28, 2002, with a total of 286 episodes. It was replaced by Kahit Kailan in its timeslot.

A remake was aired in 2013.

Cast and characters

Lead cast
Antoinette Taus as Anna Karenina "Anna" Serrano Monteclaro and Anna Karolina Monteclaro / Victoria "Bekbek"
Sunshine Dizon as Anna Karenina "Karen" Villarama
Kim delos Santos as Anna Karenina "Nina" Fuentebella

Supporting cast
Pinky Amador as Margarita "Maggie" Monteclaro
Rosemarie Gil as Doña Carmela Cruz-Monteclaro
Chinggoy Alonzo as Don Xernan Monteclaro
Maritoni Fernandez as Ruth Monteclaro
Dingdong Dantes as Brix
Polo Ravales as Vincent
Dino Guevarra as Brian
Tanya Garcia as Anna Karenina "Grace" San Victores

Recurring cast
Katya Santos as Carla
Harold Macasero as Aldrin
Toby Alejar as Abel
Mat Ranillo III as Raul 
Czarina Lopez de Leon as Nayda
Anne Curtis as Ginny
Chubi del Rosario as Benjie
Joanne Quintas as Melissa Cruz
Marky Lopez as Dennis
Bea Bueno as China
Kristine Garcia as Agnes
Aiza Marquez as Samantha 
Ramon Recto as Jim
Red Sternberg as Milo
Maui Taylor as Brigitte
Vivian Foz
Dimples Romana as young Carmela Cruz-Monteclaro 
Rita Avila
Rufa Mae Quinto as Chona
Cheska Diaz
Gloria Diaz

References

External links
 

1996 Philippine television series debuts
2002 Philippine television series endings
Filipino-language television shows
GMA Network drama series
Philippine teen drama television series
Television series about teenagers
Television series by Viva Television
Television shows set in the Philippines